Season 2006-07 saw Livingston compete in the First Division. They also competed in the Challenge Cup, League Cup and the Scottish Cup.

Summary
Livingston finished 6th in their first season back in the Scottish First Division having been relegated from the Scottish Premier League.

Results & fixtures

First Division

Challenge Cup

League Cup

Scottish Cup

Statistics

League table

References

Livingston
Livingston F.C. seasons